Enterprise & Society is a peer-reviewed academic journal on business history published by Cambridge University Press for the Business History Conference, which holds its copyright.

Abstracting and indexing 
According to the Journal Citation Reports, the journal has a 2016 impact factor of 0.593, ranking it 110th out of 121 journals in the category "Business" and 14th out of 35 in the category "History of Social Sciences". In addition, the journal is abstracted and indexed in Current Contents/Social and Behavioral Sciences, International Bibliography of the Social Sciences, ProQuest, Scopus, and Social Sciences Citation Index.

References

History journals
Business and management journals
Oxford University Press academic journals
Quarterly journals
English-language journals
Publications established in 1999
Cambridge University Press academic journals